The Cambodia National Rescue Movement (CNRM) is a Cambodian political movement founded in 2018, by exiled former opposition leader Sam Rainsy, following the dissolution of the Cambodia National Rescue Party in November 2017. The movement has no legal status in Cambodia and has been branded as a "terrorist group" by the authoritarian government of Hun Sen.

References 

Banned political parties
Cambodian democracy movements
Liberal International
Political parties established in 2018